Provincial Road 268 (PR 268), known locally as the Lenswood Highway, is a provincial road in the Canadian province of Manitoba.

Route description 
Provincial Road 268 starts east of the town of Minitonas, and goes from Highway 10 to the village of Birch River. This allows a traveller to bypass the town of Swan River completely. The highway is a faster route to Birch River than if one were to continue down Highway 10 to Swan River before turning north towards the village. The highway has four bridges, over the Sinclair River, Swan River, Woody River, and Birch River. The Swan River bridge is the northernmost crossing of the Swan River. The bridge was replaced in October 2012 because the old one was too narrow.

Next to the Swan River is the small community of Lenswood, for which the highway is named.

References 

268